Lieutenant Colonel Lord Herbert Andrew Montagu Douglas Scott,  (30 November 1872 – 17 June 1944) was the fifth child born to William Henry Walter Montagu Douglas Scott, 6th Duke of Buccleuch & 8th Duke of Queensberry and Louisa Montagu Douglas Scott, Duchess of Buccleuch and Queensberry.

Montagu Douglas Scott was a great-grandfather to Sarah, Duchess of York, and a maternal great-great-grandfather to Princess Beatrice of York and Princess Eugenie of York. He was also a paternal uncle of Princess Alice, Duchess of Gloucester, and thereby a maternal granduncle to Prince William of Gloucester and Prince Richard, Duke of Gloucester.

Early life, marriage, and family
Herbert Andrew Montagu Douglas Scott was born at Montagu House in Whitehall, London, on 30 November 1872. He was the fifth child born in a family of six boys and two girls.

On 26 April 1905, he married Marie Josephine Agnes Edwards, daughter of James Andrew Edwards and Kate Marion Agnes MacNamara, at St Peter's Church, Eaton Square, London. They had three children:

 Brigadier Andrew Montagu Douglas Scott (13 July 1906 – 24 January 1971)
 Marian Montagu Douglas Scott (16 June 1908 – 11 December 1996)
 Patricia Katherine Montagu Douglas Scott (9 October 1910 – 3 December 2012)

Military career
Montagu Douglas Scott was commissioned into the part-time 3rd (Edinburgh Light Infantry Militia) Battalion, Royal Scots, a regiment that had been raised by the 3rd Duke of Buccleuch and also commanded by the 5th Duke. He was promoted to captain on 24 February 1894.

In December 1899 Montagu Douglas Scott was appointed for active service as a staff officer and extra Aide-de-camp to Lord Roberts, Commander-in-Chief of the forces in South Africa during the early part of the Second Boer War. While stationed in South Africa, he was transferred to the regular army and appointed a second lieutenant in the newly created Irish Guards on 15 August 1900. Promoted to lieutenant on 6 October 1900, he served in the Guards Mounted Infantry in most of 1901, and was promoted to captain on 22 January 1902. For his war effort he was mentioned in despatches, awarded the Distinguished Service Order, and received the Queen's South Africa Medal with six clasps and the King's South Africa Medal with two clasps. Following the end of hostilities in June 1902 he returned to England, leaving Cape Town in the SS Norman, which arrived in Southampton in early September that year. He was promoted in 1910 to lieutenant colonel in the 23rd (County of London) Battalion, London Regiment.

Lieutenant Colonel Montagu Douglas Scott fought in the First World War and was commander of the 1st/23rd London Regiment in France.

Civilian career
After his retirement from military service, he accepted a position as Chairman of Rolls-Royce.

Death
Lieutenant Colonel Lord Herbert Andrew Montagu Douglas Scott died on 17 June 1944, at his home 'Shroner Wood', in Martyr Worthy, near Winchester, Hampshire. His estate was previously the home of Edwin Hillier, the grandfather of horticulturist Harold Hillier. He was 71 years old. At the time of his death, he was predeceased by one grandson, John Andrew Ferguson; he was survived by his wife, Marie Josephine, his three children, Claud Andrew, Marian Louisa, and Patricia Katherine, and seven grandchildren.

Honours and awards
19 April 1901: Distinguished Service Order
4 March 1912: Knight of Justice of the Order of St. John of Jerusalem
2 February 1916: Companion of the Order of St Michael and St George
Mentioned in Despatches
1 May 1917: Officer of the Legion of Honour (France)
6 June 1922: His Majesty's Bodyguard of the Honourable Corps of Gentlemen at Arms
31 December 1930: Deputy Lieutenant of London
Royal Company of Archers
2 April 1940: Hon. Air Commodore Auxiliary Air Force

Ancestry

References

Younger sons of dukes
People from Westminster
British Army personnel of the Second Boer War
British Army personnel of World War I
Royal Scots officers
Irish Guards officers
London Regiment officers
Companions of the Distinguished Service Order
Companions of the Order of St Michael and St George
Knights of Justice of the Order of St John
Deputy Lieutenants of the County of London
Herbert
1944 deaths
1872 births
Members of the Royal Company of Archers
Honourable Corps of Gentlemen at Arms
Military personnel from Middlesex